Nimir Abdel-Aziz (born 5 February 1992) is a Dutch volleyball player, member of the Netherlands men's national volleyball team, 2012 European League winner. At the professional club level, he plays for the Turkish club Halkbank.

Career

National Team
Abdel-Aziz made his debut as the setter for the Dutch national team in 2011 against Belgium. He won the European League in 2012, after beating Turkey in the final.

Position Change 
In 2016, Abdel-Aziz changed his position from setter to opposite hitter in his club Stade Poitevin Poitiers. He has since then continued his volleyball career as an opposite in both clubs and the Dutch National Team.

In the 2020-21 CEV Champions League, he had to briefly play the setter role for Trentino Volley after both of the lined up setters were not available to compete in the pool play due to COVID-19.

Sporting achievements

Clubs

 CEV Champions League
  2012/2013 – with Bre Banca Lannutti Cuneo
  2020/2021 – with Trentino Volley
 Asian Club Championship
  2022 – with Paykan Iran at Tehran
 National championships
 2009/2010  Dutch Championship, with Dynamo Apeldoorn

Individual awards
 2012: European League – Best Server 
 2012: European League – Best Setter
 2021: CEV European Championship – Best Opposite

References

External links

 
 Player profile at LegaVolley.it  
 Player profile at PlusLiga.pl  
 Player profile at Volleybox.net

1992 births
Living people
Sportspeople from The Hague
Dutch men's volleyball players
Dutch expatriate sportspeople in Italy
Expatriate volleyball players in Italy
Dutch expatriate sportspeople in Turkey
Expatriate volleyball players in Turkey
Dutch expatriate sportspeople in Poland
Expatriate volleyball players in Poland
Dutch expatriate sportspeople in France
Expatriate volleyball players in France
ZAKSA Kędzierzyn-Koźle players
Setters (volleyball)
Opposite hitters